Suryakantham is a 2019 Indian Telugu-language romantic drama film starring Niharika Konidela, Rahul Vijay, and Perlene Bhesania. The film is produced by American-based Yerramreddy and Yarabolu under the banner of Nirvana Cinemas.

Cast 
Niharika Konidela as Suryakantham
Rahul Vijay as Abhi
Perlene Bhesania as Pooja
Suhasini Maniratnam as Supriya, Suryakantham's mother
Satya as Sunny
Sivaji Raja as Abhi's father
Madhumani as Abhi's mother
Nayani Pavani as Meera, Suryakantham's friend
Koteshwar Rao as Pooja's father
Roopa Lakshmi as Pooja's mother
Akshara Kishor as the child Suryakantham

Soundtrack 

The songs were composed by Mark K Robin.

Release 
The Times of India gave the film two-and-a-half stars out of five and wrote that "The good news is, Niharika is a revelation as Suryakantham, a character that is a refreshing change from the kinds of damsel-in-distresses TFI [Telugu film industry] usually seems to offer". The Hindu wrote that "The plot is nothing new, and by the end of the film, it feels like another web series put up on the big screen". The New Indian Express gave the film two out of five stars and wrote that "With a strong first half, it is a shame that Pranith couldn’t keep up the expectations in the second half aside from a couple of high moments". The Hans India wrote, "The movie has a weak story and draggy scenes which are the minus points. Overall, Suryakantham is a good film but can be watched only once."

References

External links 

Indian romantic drama films
Indian drama films
2019 romantic drama films